Carl Ekman may refer to:
Carl Daniel Ekman (1845–1904), Swedish chemical engineer
Carl Gustaf Ekman (1872–1945), Swedish prime minister

See also
Karl Ekman (1892–1945), Swedish wrestler